Gordon Singleton,  (born 9 August 1956) is a past world-record holding Canadian cyclist.  In 1982, he became the first Canadian cyclist to win a world championship, and he was the first, and only, cyclist in history to simultaneously hold world records in all three of cycling's sprint races: the 200m, 500m and 1000m distances. An Olympic racer, he was deprived of competing in the 1980 Olympics at the peak of his career by Canada's boycott of those games in Moscow.

Early career
Singleton entered cycling at the age of 17 in 1974, when he raced for the St. Catharine's cycling club.  His first track race was the Ontario Junior sprint championship held in Woodbridge Ontario, in which he won a gold medal. Later that year he would compete in the Canadian Junior Nationals, where he captured a silver medal.  The following year, Singleton would graduate to the elite men's circuit and captured his first Canadian National sprint title in Calgary. Realizing early in his ambition to become an international sprint cyclist. Gordon ventured over to the U.K. where he settled in Liverpool. It was in Harry Quinn's bike shop that he met his eventual coach and mentor. Mr. Eddie Soens. The relationship was a winning combination.

Career on the elite men's circuit
In his first year racing on the elite circuit, after spending a single season on the juniors, Singleton won the Canadian men's sprint championship in Calgary 1975.  It would be the first of 11 National titles Singleton would win at the Canadian Cycling Championships. Later that year he represented Canada at his first World Championship in Liege, Belgium. Although he did not finish in a medal position, Singleton, along with future Hall of Fame cyclist Jocelyn Lovell, led a Canadian surge onto the cycling stage in the 1970s and 1980s. Also in 1975, Singleton would represent Canada in his first of two Pan American Games, although a crash in training prior to competition prevented him from competing for a medal.

Singleton would represent Canada in the 1976 Olympic Games on his home turf in Montreal, Canada, at only 19 years of age. Although he did not reach the medal round, he became the first Canadian sprinter to reach the 1/8 round in the 1000 meter sprint. He would continue to rise in the international rankings, and would again represent Canada in 1978, this time at the Commonwealth Games, which took place in Edmonton.  For the first time in his career, Singleton would win a medal in international competition, when he took home the bronze in the 1000 meter Time Trial.  He would follow that up when he teamed up with Jocelyn Lovell in the Tandem Sprint, and the pair took home the Gold.  By 1979, Singleton had risen to be one of the top three sprint racers in the world, and he would remain in the top 3 through 1982. That year he won his first medal at the world level, a silver in the 1000 meters Time Trial, at the World Championships in Amersterdam. Singleton would also compete at the Pan American Games in 1979 in Puerto Rico, where he would win double gold, in the 1000 meter Time Trial and the Match Sprint.

In 1980, at the height of his career, Singleton was the #2 ranked sprint cyclist in the world, and one of the favorites for the gold medals at that year's summer Olympics.  However, when the Canadians joined the US-led boycott of the Moscow Olympics, due to the Soviet invasion of Afghanistan, Singleton was deprived of competing in his second Olympics. In lieu of the Olympics, the Canadian Government set up an opportunity with additional funding for 20 of its top summer athletes to compete in an alternative competition. For Gordon and cycling there were no more big events that season. After discussions with his coach, Mr Eddie Soens of Liverpool. It was decided to attack all 3 World Records at the sprint distances. During a single 24-hour period, Singleton set new world records in three separate events: the 200, 500 and 1000 meters.  He was the first, and remains the only, cyclist in history to simultaneously hold records in these three distances. The following year, 1981, Singleton would take the silver medal in the 200 meters, behind Koichi Nakano of Japan.  He would also finish fourth in the second ever Keirin championship, which was won by Danny Clark of Australia.

In 1982, Singleton's last year on the elite circuit, he would become the first Canadian in history to win a World Championship in cycling, defeating two-time champion Clark to win the gold medal in the keirin. In his final race, again facing Nakano in the match sprint event, he collide with the Japanese rider, causing him to fall, the result of which was a broken collarbone, forcing him to retire, and settle for the silver medal. The collision was controversial, as it was unclear who initiated the contact, although Singleton always maintained that it was Nakano who collided with him. It was the second collision between the two riders during the competition, the earlier one also appeared to be initiated by Singleton. Also that year, he would win first place at the Grand Prix in London, England, setting British records for flying 200 meter & 500 meter events. Norman Sheil, two time World Champion in the 4000 meter individual pursuit in 1955 and 1958, was the coach of the Canadian National team from 1978 to 1982. He said of Singleton:

Gordon Singleton had a tremendous impact on our entire program during my time with the Canadian National Team. His work ethic, commitment and unyielding desire made him the ideal athlete to coach. He was a fantastic role model in the weight room, at the track and was always totally prepared and committed on race day. Specifically, he helped create a culture of total professionalism and unselfishness that made the difference at the major competitions.

World Masters career
Singleton would re-enter competitive cycling in the 1990s.  He was triumphant in his return to the World Masters event in 1998, where he was a double Gold Medal winner, in the sprint and 750 meter time trial (40–45 year category). In 2006, Singleton would repeat in the sprint category, this time in the 50- to 55-year-old category, taking home the Gold.

Other career achievements
 Won a total of 11 Canadian National cycling titles: 1975, 1976 (2), 1977, 1979 (4), 1980 (3); also won 4 silver medals: 1974 (junior), 1976, 1977, 1980.
 Represented Canada at 6 World Championships achieving 1 World Title (1982-Kierin) and 3 silver medals (1979-1000 meter time trial, 1981-1000 meter sprint, 1982-1000 meter sprint).
 Set British records in the flying 200 meters and the flying 500 meters
 Selected Ontario athlete of the year 1979.
 Runner up to Terry Fox (Hall of Fame class of 1980) for the Lou Marsh award, Canadian athlete of the year 1980.
 Runner up to Ken Read (Hall of Fame class of 1980) Canadian Male Amateur athlete of the year, 1979.
 Runner up to Wayne Gretzky (Hall of Fame class of 1982) for the Lou Marsh award 1982.
 Received Order of Canada 1986 < 17 https://www.gg.ca/honour.aspx?id=1561&t=12&ln=Singleton>
 Received automatic induction into the Niagara Falls Sports wall of fame, 1989
 Niagara Falls Sports athlete of the century to celebrate the city's centenary.
 Valley Preferred Lehigh Country Velodrome, Allentown Pa. Hall of Fame inductee 1996. On August 1, 1980, he broke three track records in one night as preparation to the World Record attempts in Mexico City, October 1980. 
 Represented the City of Niagara Falls as a celebration destination for the 2010 Olympic Torch run leading to the games in Vancouver.
 The 2014 Canadian Track Championships were held at the new Velodrome built in Milton, Ontario for the 2015 Pan American Games. Singleton won a bronze medal in the Masters "C" Category sprint title.
 Inducted into Canada's Cycling Hall of Fame located at the Mattamy Velodrome in Milton Ontario, October, 10th  2015

Personal life
Singleton married Louann Godak in 1981, and the couple has two sons: Chris and Jamie, who both went on to win national championships in their respective sports soccer and football: Chris — CISSA National Championship soccer, Ridley College 2003; and Jamie,  McMaster University won the Vanier Cup in Vancouver 2011.

References

<17 https://www.gg.ca/honour.aspx?id=1561&t=12&ln=Singleton>

External links
 1982 World Keirin Final
 1982 World Championships final of the 200 meters
 2006 Masters Sprint Championships, 50–54 age group

1956 births
Living people
Canadian male cyclists
Cyclists at the 1976 Summer Olympics
Olympic cyclists of Canada
Cyclists at the 1978 Commonwealth Games
Commonwealth Games gold medallists for Canada
Commonwealth Games bronze medallists for Canada
UCI Track Cycling World Champions (men)
Members of the Order of Canada
Commonwealth Games medallists in cycling
Pan American Games medalists in cycling
Pan American Games gold medalists for Canada
Canadian track cyclists
Cyclists at the 1979 Pan American Games
Medalists at the 1979 Pan American Games
Medallists at the 1978 Commonwealth Games